The Guide Falls and Upper Guide Falls, a tieredcascade waterfall on the Guide River, is located in the North West region of Tasmania, Australia.

Location and features

To access the falls from Burnie, take the road towards Cradle Mountain, turn right just outside the boundary of Ridgley, continue down into the gully, and turn left at the posted gate sign. Once entered, the Guide River is to the right. Continue to drive up the gravel road where the falls are located. There are a set of steps which lead down to the bottom of the falls. There are picnic tables and barbecue areas nearby.

See also

 List of waterfalls of Tasmania

References

Waterfalls of Tasmania
North West Tasmania
Cascade waterfalls
Tiered waterfalls